Christine Rayoni Head (born 18 February 1976; married Rayoni Nelson) is a former Australian badminton player. She competed at the 2000 Summer Olympics in Sydney, Australia. Head played in the singles event won a match to Robbyn Hermitage of Canada in the first round, but was defeated by Chan Ya-lin of Chinese Taipei in the second round. In the doubles event she teamed-up with Kellie Lucas, the duo were defeated in the first round to Thai pair Sujitra Ekmongkolpaisarn and Saralee Thungthongkam. Head was part of the South Australian team, and represented Australia in 1998, 2002 Uber Cup, and 1998 Commonwealth Games. Head has a Bachelor of Management and a Masters in Sport Management, and work as manager, physical activity, sport and healthy eating at VicHealth.

Achievements

Oceania Championships
Women's singles

Women's doubles

IBF International
Women's singles

Women's doubles

References

External links
 
 

1976 births
Living people
People from the London Borough of Hillingdon
Sportspeople from London
Sportswomen from South Australia
Australian female badminton players
Olympic badminton players of Australia
Badminton players at the 2000 Summer Olympics
Badminton players at the 1998 Commonwealth Games
Commonwealth Games medallists in badminton
Commonwealth Games bronze medallists for Australia
Medallists at the 1998 Commonwealth Games